Araeolaimus elegans is a species of marine free living nematodes from the North Sea.

References 

 Araeolaimus elegans at WoRMS

Araeolaimida
Nematodes described in 1888
Fauna of the North Sea
Taxa named by Johannes Govertus de Man